Jim Hannan (1864 – 22 June 1905) was a Welsh international rugby union player who played club rugby for Newport. A strong tactical forward his scrummaging work was excellent and could pivot the whole scrum around him.

He first played for Newport in the 1884/85 season, but played only the single game. The next season, he was a regular member of the first XV finding himself surrounded by many of the Welsh international forwards. In the 1891/92 season Hannon was part of the unbeaten Newport team.

International rugby career
Hannan was first capped for Wales against the touring New Zealand Māori team on 22 December 1888 and scored a try in the game. He would represent his team on another 18 occasions, and although on the losing side more often than not, he was part of the 1890 Wales team that beat England for the first time at Dewsbury in 1890. In 1893 he was part of the Wales team that won their first Triple Crown under the captaincy of Arthur Gould.

International matches played
Wales
  1888
  1890, 1891, 1892, 1893, 1894, 1895
 Ireland  1889, 1890, 1892, 1893, 1894, 1895
  1889, 1890, 1892, 1893, 1894, 1895

Bibliography

References

1864 births
1905 deaths
Rugby union players from Newport, Wales
Welsh rugby union players
Wales international rugby union players
Rugby union forwards
Newport RFC players
London Welsh RFC players